Cecil Hanify (1 August 1887 – 28 October 1964) was an Australian cricketer. He played in one first-class match for Queensland in 1912/13.

See also
 List of Queensland first-class cricketers

References

External links
 

1887 births
1964 deaths
Australian cricketers
Queensland cricketers
Cricketers from Brisbane